Jersey Scottish Football Club is a football club based on the Channel Island of Jersey. They are affiliated to the Jersey Football Association and play in the Jersey Football Combination Premiership. They won the first 2 Combinations but stopped playing, and so St. Paul's F.C. won the rest.

References

Football clubs in Jersey
Association football clubs established in 1960
1960 establishments in Jersey
Saint Brélade